José Alfredo Murguía Sosa (born May 29, 1969, in León, Guanajuato) is a Mexican football manager and former player. He played for Tigres UANL during the 1995-96 season.

External links
 

1969 births
Living people
Mexican footballers
Association football defenders
Mexican football managers
Club León footballers
Tigres UANL footballers
Liga MX players
Footballers from Guanajuato
Sportspeople from León, Guanajuato